Michaël Dudok de Wit (born 15 July 1953) is a Dutch animator, director and illustrator based in London. He won an Academy Award for Best Animated Short Film for Father and Daughter (2000)  and was nominated for an Academy Award for Best Animated Feature for The Red Turtle (2016).

Early life and education
Michaël Dudok de Wit was born in Abcoude in the Netherlands. After his high school education in the Netherlands, he attended the Geneva School of Fine Arts. In 1978, he graduated from the West Surrey College of Art & Design (now the University for the Creative Arts) with his first film The Interview.

Career
After working for a year in Barcelona, he settled in London where he directs and animates award-winning commercials for television and cinema. In 1992, he created the short film Tom Sweep, followed by The Monk and the Fish (1994), (Making of Father and Daughter) Focal Press.  which was made in France with the studio Folimage. This film was nominated for an Oscar  and has won numerous prizes including a César Award for Best Short Film and the Cartoon d'or. Michael also writes and illustrates children's picture books and teaches animation at art colleges in England and abroad.

His film Father and Daughter (2000) won an Academy Award, a BAFTA Award, the Grand Prix at Annecy, Grand Prix at Animafest Zagreb and dozens of other major awards. In 2006, he made the short film The Aroma of Tea, which was drawn entirely with tea. His films The Monk and the Fish and Father and Daughter were included in the Animation Show of Shows. In 2016, he released the feature-length film The Red Turtle. It was nominated for Best Animated Feature Film at the 89th Academy Awards.

Style
Since Tom Sweep, all Dudok de Wit's films have his trademark brush stroke drawing and his use of ink and watercolour.

Filmography

Animation
The Interview (1978)
Tom Sweep (1992), short film
The Monk and the Fish (Le Moine et le poisson) (1994), short film
Father and Daughter (2000), short film
The Aroma of Tea (2006), short film
The Red Turtle (2016), feature film

Commercials
"Actifed Germ" The Welcome Foundation, Cough Medicine
"Heinz Egg" Heinz Salad Cream
"The Long Sleep" Mcallan Malt Whiskey
"VW Sunrise" Volkswagen
"Pink Foot" Owen's Corning Roof Insulation
"Smart Illusions" Nestlé Smarties
"Noah" The Irish Lottery"
"AT&T" five TV commercials
"A Life" United Airlines

Film and television animation contributions
The Canterbury Tales/The Knight's Tale (Television series, Pizazz/S4C, UK)
The Lion, the Witch and The Wardrobe (TV Feature, US, UK and Spain) 1979
Den segment of Heavy Metal (Film featuring the animation of Gerald Potterton, Canada, US & UK) 1980
Mickey's Audition (Mickey Mouse Special, Disney, US) 1989
Prince Cinders (Television special, UK) 1991
Beauty and the Beast (Storyboarding, Walt Disney Feature Animation, US) 1992
T.R.A.N.S.I.T. (Short film directed by Piet Kroon, UK and NL) 1997
Charlie's Christmas (Television Special, Folimage, France) 1998
Fantasia 2000 (Walt Disney Feature Animation) 2000
Raining Cats and Frogs (Folimage) 2003

Illustrations in books
"Snakes and Ladders" (card game, 1991)
"The History of Geneva" (Editions Chenoises, Geneva 1991)
"Oscar & Hoo" (HarperCollins 2001)  (translated in various languages)
"Oscar and Hoo Forever"(HarperCollins 2003)  (translated in various languages)
"Vader en dochter" (Leopold, NL, 2001)  (translated in various languages)
"Vier bevertjes in de nacht" (Leopold, NL, 2004)  (translated in various languages)
"Vier bevertjes en een kastanje" (Leopold, NL, 2007)  (translated in various languages)

References

External links

Michaël Dudok de Wit at USA representative Acme Filmworks

1953 births
Alumni of the University for the Creative Arts
César Award winners
Directors of Best Animated Short Academy Award winners
Dutch animators
Dutch animated film directors
Dutch expatriates in the United Kingdom
Dutch film directors
Dutch illustrators
Living people
People from Abcoude